Julián Palacios (born 4 February 1999) is an Argentine professional footballer currently playing as a midfielder for Campeonato Brasileiro Série A club Goiás on loan from San Lorenzo of the Argentine Primera División. He is the brother of fellow footballer Matías Palacios.

Career

San Lorenzo

Banfield (loan)

Goiás (loan)
On 28 December 2022 Campeonato Brasileiro Série A club Goiás signed Palacios from San Lorenzo on a one-year loan, his first experience abroad.

Career statistics

Club

Notes

References

1999 births
Living people
Argentine footballers
Association football midfielders
People from General Pico
San Lorenzo de Almagro footballers
Club Atlético Banfield footballers
Goiás Esporte Clube players
Argentine Primera División players
Campeonato Brasileiro Série A players
Argentine expatriate sportspeople in Brazil
Expatriate footballers in Brazil